Hydroporus signatus is a species of predaceous diving beetle in the family Dytiscidae. It is found in North America.

Subspecies
These two subspecies belong to the species Hydroporus signatus:
 Hydroporus signatus signatus Mannerheim, 1853
 Hydroporus signatus youngi Gordon, 1981

References

Further reading

 
 

Dytiscidae
Articles created by Qbugbot
Beetles described in 1853